Bruno Aquino Morais (born 21 June 1991) is a Brazilian footballer who played for KF Laçi as a forward.

Career
Born in Campo Grande, Bruno Aquino began playing football in the youth system of local side Clube Esportivo Nova Esperança (CENE). At age 16, he played for the club's senior team in the Campeonato Sul-Mato-Grossense, scoring three goals in four matches. CENE sold his contract rights to a group of businessmen, and he signed for União São João Esporte Clube at age 17. Bruno Aquino struggled to adapt in União São João's youth system, and moved on to Goiás Esporte Clube. At Goiás, Bruno Aquino broke into the senior team, and would make his professional debut in the Campeonato Brasileiro Série B.

References

External links

1991 births
Living people
Association football forwards
Brazilian footballers
KF Laçi players
Red Bull Brasil players
Tupi Football Club players
Goiás Esporte Clube players
Associação Atlética Aparecidense players
Goianésia Esporte Clube players
Boa Esporte Clube players
Treze Futebol Clube players
Esporte Clube Mamoré players
Esporte Clube Taubaté players
People from Campo Grande
Sportspeople from Mato Grosso do Sul